André Arnyvelde (29 November 1881 – 2 February 1942) was a French journalist, dramatist and novelist.

Works 
 La Courtisane, dramatic comedy in five acts, in verses, Éditions Fasquelle, 1906
 L'Arche, Société mutuelle d'édition, 1920

Sources 
 Claude Carras, « Ceux qu'ils ont tué : André Arnyvelde », Gavroche, 8 février 1945, p. 33.
 Jean-Yves Tadié, Marcel Proust, Gallimard, 1996, p. 707

1881 births
1942 deaths
20th-century French non-fiction writers
20th-century French male writers